The red-necked amazon (Amazona arausiaca), also known as the red-necked parrot, Dominican blue-faced amazon, lesser Dominican amazon, and Jaco parrot, is an amazon parrot endemic to Dominica.

It is green, with bright splashes of various colours. Its name is due to the area of red plumage commonly found at its throat.

The hypothetical Martinique amazon (A. martinicana), known only from old descriptions, was said to look quite similar, and may have been a related (or even the same species). It was said to occur on one major island to the south of Dominica.

Description
The red-necked amazon gets its name because of its orange and reddish feathers found on its lower throat.

The bird also sometimes has blue feathers on its forehead, around the eyes and its head. Although, the blue feathers verge to wither away to gray feathers at its upper breast. The rest of its body is covered in deep bottle green feathers and a wide band of yellow color runs down to the tip of its tail. The beak and feet are both grey. These birds average about 40 cm in length and can weigh between 550 and 650 g.

Range, habitat
The red-necked amazon is only found in the Caribbean island of Dominica. It lives throughout Montane and sub-montane forests of Morne Diablotion and Northern and Central Forest Reserves and sequestered State Lands that are above 1500 ft elevation.

This species also lives at subordinate altitudes in agricultural regions and peripheral forests all the way to the northwest and northeast coasts. The Jacos primarily eat flowers, sprouts, seeds and fruits of the rainforest trees and plants, citrus and pastoral crops.

With a population of less than 400 birds, this beautiful parrot is very endangered due to its habitat destruction and hunting.

Social organisation
The species is highly social and flies in groups of 30 or more during the non-breeding season. Exceedingly territorial during nesting, breeding inaugurates from January to March, with fledging from May to July.

Red-necked amazon pairs are loyal to each other and tend to stay at the same nesting site for many years. Other than early morning and afternoon calls, these birds are fairly quiet and difficult to detect in the wild because they are well cloaked by their fluff. They are dexterous climbing birds and are prone to migrate seasonally, provisional on food supplies.

Call
Red-necked amazons are most vigorous and animated in the early mornings from dawn to around 10 am, and again in the late afternoon after about 4 pm. During those periods they are most communicative. The cry of the red-necked amazon is rough with a high-pitched squawk and usually uses two-syllable notes.

Threats
Red-necked amazon numbers have been diminishing through the 20th Century, primarily as a consequence of hunting for food and, to a lesser degree, the pet trade, and, more recently, by the clearing of forests for agriculture.

Luckily, hunting and illegal trade no longer pose a serious threat, and this buoyant bird has made a notable recovery, both in range extension and overall population size, after its population size decreased to an all-time low of as few as 150 individuals in 1980.

Through substantial conservation action, this species has recovered to a far healthier 750 to 800 birds (2003 population estimates). Due to this, the species seems to have successfully survived Hurricane Maria in 2017, which devastated the entirety of Dominica; all of the captive birds were safe after the hurricane, and several wild birds were also sighted flying around the island.

References

External links

BirdLife Species Factsheet

red-necked amazon
Endemic birds of Dominica
red-necked amazon
red-necked amazon